Bridget J. Stutchbury is a Canadian biologist, currently a Distinguished Research Professor and Canada Research Chair in Ecology and Conservation Biology at York University.  She is the author of the book Silence of the Songbirds, finalist for the 2007 Governor General's Award for Non-fiction.

Education and early career 
Bridget Stutchbury earned an M.Sc. at Queen's University and a Ph.D. at Yale University before going on to complete postdoctoral and research associate work at the Smithsonian Institution.

Awards and recognition 

 Shortlisted for the Governor General's Award, 2007.
 Shortlisted for the Canadian Museum of Nature Nature Inspiration Awards, 2022.

List of works

Books 
 Silence of the Songbirds, Walker & Co., 2007, 
 The Bird Detective: Investigating the Secret Lives of Birds, HarperCollins, 2011, 
 The Private Lives of Birds: A Scientist Reveals the Intricacies of Avian Social Life, Walker & Co., 2011,

Selected Journal Publications 

 Horn, L., T. K. Remmel, B. J. M. Stutchbury. 2021. Weak evidence of carry-over effects of overwinter climate and habitat productivity on spring arrival of migratory songbirds at a northern stopover site. Ornithological Applications. https://doi.org/10.1093/ornithapp/duab012
 Albert, S., J. D. Wolfe, J. Kellerman, T. Sherry, B. J. M. Stutchbury, N. J. Bayly, A. Ruiz-Sánchez. 2020. Habitat ecology of Nearctic–Neotropical migratory landbirds on the nonbreeding grounds. Ornithological Applications. 122: https://doi.org/10.1093/condor/duaa055
 VanVliet, H., B. J. M. Stutchbury, A. E. M. Newman, and D. R. Norris. 2020. The impacts of agricultural intensification on an obligate grassland bird of North America. Agriculture, Ecosystems and Environment 106696.  https://doi.org/10.1016/j.agee.2019.106696 
 Eng, M. L. Bridget J.M. Stutchbury, and Christy A. Morrissey. 2019. Neonicotinoid insecticide reduces fueling and delays migration in songbirds. Science 365: 1177-1180. https://doi.org/10.1126/science.aaw9419
 Eng, M. B. J. M. Stutchbury, and C.  Morrissey. 2017. Imidacloprid and chlorpyrifos insecticides impair migratory ability in a seed-eating songbird. Scientific Reports, 7: 15176 https://doi.org/10.1038/s41598-017-15446-x
 Stutchbury B. J. M, R. Siddiqui, K. Fraser K. 2016. Ecological causes and consequences of intra-tropical migration in long-distance migratory birds. Invited paper. American Naturalist 188, S28–S40 https://www.jstor.org/stable/26519254

References

Year of birth missing (living people)
Living people
Academic staff of York University
Canadian biologists
Canadian ecologists
Women ecologists
Non-fiction environmental writers
Canadian science writers
21st-century Canadian women writers
21st-century Canadian non-fiction writers
Canadian women non-fiction writers
21st-century Canadian women scientists